Danger Street is a 1928 American silent drama film directed by Ralph Ince and starring Warner Baxter, Martha Sleeper and Duke Martin.

Cast
 Warner Baxter as Rolly Sigsby  
 Martha Sleeper as Kitty  
 Duke Martin as Dorgan  
 Frank Mills as Bull  
 Harry Tenbrook as Borg  
 Harry Allen Grant as Bauer  
 Ole M. Ness as Cloom  
 Spec O'Donnell as Sammy

References

Bibliography
 Quinlan, David. The Illustrated Guide to Film Directors. Batsford, 1983.

External links

1928 films
Films directed by Ralph Ince
American silent feature films
1920s English-language films
American black-and-white films
Silent American drama films
1928 drama films
Film Booking Offices of America films
1920s American films